The baseball competition at the 2010 Central American and Caribbean Games was held in Mayagüez, Puerto Rico from July 20–28, 2010.

Medalists

Preliminaries

Pool A

Standings

Schedule

Pool B

Standings

Schedule

Final round

Playoffs

Semifinals

Bronze medal game

Final

Final standings

External links

References

Baseball at the Central American and Caribbean Games
Events at the 2010 Central American and Caribbean Games
2010
2010